The 2018 European Skateboarding Championships was held in Basel, Switzerland, between 31 August and 2 September for street skateboarding and in Malmö, Sweden, between September 3–6 for park skateboarding.

Medal summary

Park skateboarding

Street skateboarding

°His name is misspelled "Dowwe" in the official scoresheet.

°°Douwe Macare came 4th in the competition, but he was the 3rd placed European, as the third best score was made by the sole competitor from outside of Europe – 's Matias Dell Olio (82,33).

References

2018 European Skateboarding Championships
European Skateboarding Championships
2018 European Skateboarding Championships
European Climbing Championships
European Skateboarding Championships